Indergarh is a city and a municipality in Bundi district in the Indian state of Rajasthan. There is a famous Temple of Bijasan Mata situated here and every year in Navaratri huge numbers of people come here. The temple is surrounded by the Aravali range.

Demographics
 India census, Indragarh had a population of 5265. Males constitute 51% of the population and females 49%. Indragarh has an average literacy rate of 63%, higher than the national average of 59.5%: male literacy is 72%, and female literacy is 53%. In Indragarh, 17% of the population is under 6 years of age.

References

Cities and towns in Bundi district